James E. Willard (November 20, 1903 – April 27, 1988) was a Republican member of the Pennsylvania State Senate, serving from 1969 to 1970.  He also served in the Pennsylvania House of Representatives.

References

Republican Party members of the Pennsylvania House of Representatives
Republican Party Pennsylvania state senators
1903 births
1988 deaths
20th-century American politicians